Monica R. Richardson is an American newspaper editor. She became executive editor of Miami Herald on January 1, 2021. Richardson is the first Black executive editor in the Miami Herald's history.

Richardson is from Charlottesville, Virginia. She graduated from Old Dominion University. Richardson worked for the Charlottesville Observer, The Florida Times-Union, and Lexington Herald-Leader. For 15 years, she wrote for the Atlanta Journal-Constitution where she was the senior managing editor.

She adopted a daughter.

References 

Living people
20th-century American newspaper editors
African-American women journalists
21st-century American newspaper editors
Editors of Florida newspapers
Editors of Georgia (U.S. state) newspapers
Editors of Virginia newspapers
Writers from Charlottesville, Virginia
Old Dominion University alumni
20th-century American women writers
21st-century American women writers
20th-century African-American women
20th-century African-American people
21st-century African-American women
21st-century African-American people
Year of birth missing (living people)